Klimatia is a village in the northern part of the island of Corfu, Greece.  In 2001 its population was 229 for the village and 289 for the community, which includes the villages Episkopi and Kyprianades. Klimatia is situated in green hills. It is 2 km south of Nymfes and 17 km northwest of Corfu (city).

Population

See also

List of settlements in the Corfu regional unit

References

External links
 Klimatia at the GTP Travel Pages

Populated places in Corfu (regional unit)